The Danube metropolitan area or Galați–Brăila metropolitan area is a proposed metropolitan area project in Romania. It would be formed from the cities of Galați and Brăila. Together they have a population of about 430,000 people.

As defined by Eurostat,  the Galați functional urban area has a population of 322,501 residents, whilst the Brăila functional urban area has a population of 217,645 residents.

Overview
If completed, it would represent one of the largest metropolitan areas in Romania. Several major infrastructure projects have been proposed, or are being actively built: the Brăila–Galați Expressway, a new airport in Vădeni, and a bridge (the Brăila Bridge) across the Danube connecting Brăila and Galați counties to Tulcea County.

The metropolitan area has a border checkpoint to Moldova and Ukraine.

Settlements

References

Brăila
Galați
Metropolitan areas of Romania
Geography of Brăila County
Geography of Galați County